is a book by 20th-century Indian philosopher Jiddu Krishnamurti (18951986). Originally published in 1954 with a comprehensive foreword by Aldous Huxley, it was instrumental in broadening Krishnamurti's audience and exposing his ideas. It was one of the first Krishnamurti titles in the world of mainstream, commercial publishing, where its success helped establish him as a viable author. The book also established a format frequently used in later Krishnamurti publications, in which he presents his ideas on various interrelated issues, followed by discussions with one or more participants. As of 2022 several editions of the work had been published, in print and digital media.

Background
During World War II he remained at his residence in Ojai, California, in relative isolation. English author Aldous Huxley lived nearby; he met Krishnamurti in 1938, and the two men became close friends. Huxley encouraged Krishnamurti to write, and also introduced his work to Harper, Huxley's own publisher. This eventually led to the addition of Krishnamurti in the publisher's roster of authors; until that time Krishnamurti works were published by small or specialist presses, or in-house by a variety of Krishnamurti-related

About the work

Like the great majority of Krishnamurti texts, the book consists of edited excerpts from his public talks and discussions; it includes examinations of subjects that were, or became, recurrent themes in his exposition: the nature of the selfand of belief, investigations into fear and desire, the relationship between thinker and thought, the concept of choiceless awareness, the function of the mind, etc. Following an introductory chapter by Krishnamurti, each of twenty interrelated topics is covered in its own chapter. A second part ("Questions and Answers") consists of 38 named segments, taken from question-and-answer sessions between Krishnamurti and his audience; the segments broadly pertain to the topics covered in the book's first part. The book was edited (without attribution) by D. Rajagopal, Krishnamurti's thenclose associate, editor, and business manager; the included extracts were taken from "Verbatim Reports" of Krishnamurti talks between 1947 and 1952.

Huxley provided a ten-page foreword as comprehensive introduction to Krishnamurti's philosophy, an essay that "no doubt contributed to  credibility and sales potential", and he may have also influenced the overall structure and style of the work. He had read a thenrecent Krishnamurti book in 1941, and was favorably impressed, especially with a section consisting of dialogues and question-and-answer sessions between Krishnamurti and his listeners a practice that normally followed his lectures. Huxley thought they enlivened Krishnamurti's philosophical subjects, and suggested a similar format for the forthcoming book, which also became a common type of presentation in later Krishnamurti 

A commentator summarized that in this and other books, "Krishnamurti emphasized the importance of release from entrapment in the 'network of thought' through a perceptual process of attention, observation or 'choiceless awareness' which would release the true perception of reality without mediation of any authority, or guru. Another observed that it was instrumental in making Krishnamurti and his ideas known to a wider audience, as the "first substantial statement of his philosophy to be issued by major publishing houses in Britain and the United States"; noting the work's popularity among the college-age young, others added that the book "anticipated the preoccupations of an up-and-coming youth culture,  perhaps helped to form 

As in practically every work of his, Krishnamurti did not present this book as containing "a doctrine to be believed, but as an invitation to others to investigate and validate its truth for

Publication history

The book was originally published  by Harper in the US and by Gollancz in the UK. In the US, it was the second Krishnamurti-authored book to be published by a mainstream commercial publisherunlike in other markets, where this would be the first such publication.

Unlike the editions of the  later editions of the work (such as one ), included a variety of Krishnamurti photographs on the front cover. A digital edition in several e-book formats was first published by HarperCollins e-Books in 2010 .

About a third of the work was included in The Penguin Krishnamurti Reader, a 1970 compilation edited by Krishnamurti biographer Mary Lutyens, that was also a commercial and critical success. In addition, Penguin Books through its Ebury Publishing division published a new edition of The First and Last Freedom in 2013, with an edition-specific Preface. This was marketed as a mass market paperback by the division's Rider imprint , and as an e-book by its digital media 

As of 2022, according to one source, there had been 95 editions in several formats by a variety of publishers, published in eight languages. Several years prior, the work had also been made available as a freely readable electronic document through , the official Jiddu Krishnamurti online

Select editions

 
  Reprints of this edition may have different covers and author photographs.

Reception
A Krishnamurti biographer wrote that Huxley's foreword "set the mood to take the work very seriously", and another stated that by the end of  the book was responsible for attracting larger audiences to Krishnamurti's talks. Jean Burden, in a sympathetic 1959 article in the Prairie Schooner, partly attributed the increased interest in Krishnamurti to the book, while stating that as it was compiled from his "famous talks", it "suffered, as most compilations do, from repetitiveness and lack of structure. Yet Anne Morrow Lindbergh reputedly found the sheer simplicity of what he  has to  

Kirkus Reviews described it as a "clear and intriguing presentation of a point of view which will appeal to many who are finding the more traditional approaches to truth to be blind alleys. A review at The Atlanta Journal and the Atlanta Constitution contended that Krishnamurti's thinking "has the practical ring. It is so clear, so straightforward that the reader feels a challenge in every page". In contrast, The Times of India, while finding the work's basic message unoriginal, maintained that Krishnamurti's utterances have "a fluid ambiguity and an almost insidious plausibility", before concluding that the work is "all  without , and in the present context appears to be mere 

The Times Literary Supplement stated that for those who regard conflict "as an unchangeable condition of human life and truth, Krishnamurti's teaching will seem to offer a delusive short-cut to a vaguely beatific freedom. But there is nothing vague about it. It is precise and penetrating." The reviewer thinks that Krishnamurti presents "a reinterpretation of the wisdom of his  though he has rediscovered it for himself. Nevertheless, J. M. Cohen reviewing the book for The Observer (London) wrote, "Krishnamurti is an entirely independent master" adding, "or those who wish to listen, this book will have a value beyond 

The book's publication brought Krishnamurti and his ideas to the attention of practicing and theoretical psychotherapists, setting the stage for later dialogue between Krishnamurti and professionals in this field. It was also responsible for Krishnamurti's long and fruitful relationship with theoretical physicist David Bohm, whose unorthodox approach to problems of physics and of consciousness often correlated with Krishnamurti's philosophical 

The work was mentioned in education-related dissertations as early as  it continued to be cited by educational researchers in the following decades.

Among other fields, the book has been cited by occupational therapy papers, articles on medical ethics, and in original research of contemporary spirituality. But also in essays "on the social implications of the 'death of utopia, and in addresses to professional geography conferences. It has been quoted in influential works on media and has been commended as an aid to successful investment strategies. Meanwhile, more than half a century after original publication, articles in general-interest mediafor example, articles on meditation and mindfulness, favorably featured or mentioned the 

The book has inspired artistic endeavors: it has been suggested that it influenced Huxley's writing of the 1962 novel , and a painting exhibition staged in London in 2014 was "derived from two alternative perspectives: the introduction by Aldous Huxley in the book of his long-term colleague and friend, Jiddu Krishnamurti and Krishnamurti's second major opus, The First and Last Freedom". Additionally, the book has prompted comparisons between Krishnamurti's philosophy and Emily Dickinson's poetry, and has informed the way art therapy professionals approach their 

See also
 Jiddu Krishnamurti bibliography

Notes

References

 
 

 

  .

 

 

 

 

  .

 

  .

 

 

 

 

 

 .

 

 

 

 

 

 

 

 

 

 

 

 

 

 

 

 

 

 

 

 .

 .

 

 

 

 

 

 

1954 non-fiction books
Books by Jiddu Krishnamurti
Harper & Brothers books
Philosophy books
Victor Gollancz Ltd books